Brauweiler Abbey is a former Benedictine monastery located at Brauweiler, now in Pulheim near Cologne, North Rhine-Westphalia, in Germany.

History
The monastery was founded and endowed in 1024 by Pfalzgraf Ezzo, count palatine of Lotharingia of the Ezzonian dynasty and his wife Matilda of Germany, a daughter of Emperor Otto II and Theophano. Ezzo and Matilda were buried here, as were their two eldest sons Liudolf, Count Palatine of Lotharingia (d. 1031) and Otto II, Duke of Swabia (d. 1047).

From 1065 until his death in 1091, Wolfhelm of Brauweiler, later Saint Wolfhelm, was abbot here. His relics were enshrined in the abbey church, and miracles were reported at his tomb, but all traces of them were lost centuries ago.

The present abbey church, now the parish church of Saint Nicholas and Saint Medardus, is the third building on the site, built between 1136 and 1220 or later. The abbey was dissolved in the secularisation of 1803. The premises were subsequently used, under a Napoleonic law, as a hostel for beggars, and from 1815 under the Prussian regime as a workhouse.

From 1933 to 1945 the buildings were used for the internment, torture, and murder of political and social "undesirables" by the Gestapo and the civil authorities of the Nazi government. Prisoners included Konrad Adenauer, the former mayor of Cologne and first Chancellor of the Federal Republic of Germany. From 1945 to 1949, it was an open camp for displaced persons administered first by the British Army and then by UNRRA (United Nations Relief and Rehabilitation Administration).

The abbey buildings are now used by the Rheinisches Amt für Denkmalpflege ("Rhenish Department for the Care of Historic Monuments"). It hosts various events such as concerts, fine arts exhibitions, symposiums, and theatre performances on the abbey grounds.

Burials at the Abbey
Matilda of Germany, Countess Palatine of Lotharingia

References

Further reading
Bathe, Peter, 2003. Der romanische Kapitelsaal in Brauweiler. Eine kritische Bestandsaufnahme seiner Architektur, Bauskulptur und Malerei. Cologne. 
Euskirchen, Claudia, 1993: Die barocken Klostergebäude der ehemaligen Benediktinerabtei Brauweiler. Cologne. 
Schreiner, Peter, and Tontsch, Monika, 1994. Die Abteikirche St. Nikolaus und St. Medardus in Brauweiler. Baugeschichte und Ausstattung (2nd edn. 1999). Pulheim. 
Handbuch der Historischen Stätten Deutschlands, 1970. Nordrhein-Westfalen. Stuttgart: Kröner-Verlag

External links

 Brauweiler municipal website
 Friends of Brauweiler Abbey

Burial sites of the Ezzonids
Benedictine monasteries in Germany
Monasteries in North Rhine-Westphalia
1020s establishments in the Holy Roman Empire
1024 establishments in Europe
Christian monasteries established in the 11th century
Buildings and structures in Rhein-Erft-Kreis
1803 disestablishments in the Holy Roman Empire